The 1984 Stanley Cup Finals was the championship series of the National Hockey League's (NHL) 1983–84 season, and the culmination of the 1984 Stanley Cup playoffs. It was contested between the defending Campbell Conference champion Edmonton Oilers and the defending Wales Conference and Cup champion New York Islanders.

In the previous year's Stanley Cup Finals, the Islanders had swept the Oilers in four straight games. The teams met again in 1984, with the Islanders seeking their fifth consecutive Stanley Cup championship. While both teams had improved on their regular season records from the previous season, Edmonton had progressed more and finished with the best record in the NHL for the first time in their short history. It was also the first time since the implementation of the 2–3–2 format the same year that a Game 5 was actually played in the same venue as Games 3 and 4, since the Islanders had swept the previous two Finals. This was the only Finals during the era that the team with the worse record actually received home-ice advantage. Home-ice advantage reverted back to the team with the better record for the following Finals, and the Finals reverted to the former 2–2–1–1–1 format in the Finals after that.

This was the fifth straight Finals of teams that joined the NHL in 1967 or later. , the Islanders' four consecutive Cup wins (1983) and their appearance in the 1984 Cup Finals is an NHL record of 19 consecutive playoff series wins that currently stands unbroken. The 1984 Finals was the third of nine consecutive Finals contested by a team from Western Canada, second of eight contested by a team from Alberta (the Oilers appeared in six, the Calgary Flames in two, the Vancouver Canucks in one), and the first of five consecutive Finals to end with the Cup presentation on Alberta ice (the Oilers won four times at home, the Montreal Canadiens once in Calgary).

The Oilers became the fastest Canadian-based expansion team to win a major sports title by winning a title in only their fifth NHL season. The feat was eclipsed in 2016 by the Ottawa Redblacks, who won the Grey Cup in their third CFL season.

Paths to the Finals

Edmonton defeated the Winnipeg Jets 3–0, the Calgary Flames 4–3 and the Minnesota North Stars 4–0 to reach the Finals.

New York defeated the New York Rangers 3–2, the Washington Capitals 4–1, and the Montreal Canadiens 4–2 to reach the Finals.

Game summaries
NOTE: The 1984 Stanley Cup Finals were played in a 2–3–2 format, which the NBA Finals (1985–2013) and World Series (always) use, instead of the usual 2–2–1–1–1; however, the NHL would only use the format again the following season before going back to the 2–2–1–1–1 format for the 1986 Stanley Cup Finals.

Grant Fuhr shut out the Islanders in the first game, on Long Island, with Kevin McClelland scoring the game's only goal, but the Islanders won game two 6–1. The series then shifted to Edmonton for three games. In game three, the Islanders had a 2–1 lead in the second period, but Mark Messier scored on an individual effort to tie the game. They proceeded to beat the Islanders 7–2. The Oilers however, lost Fuhr for games four and five after the Islanders' Pat LaFontaine crashed into Fuhr on the forecheck during game three, and Fuhr was slow to get up. Andy Moog started games four and five. The Oilers won game four by the same score, with Wayne Gretzky scoring his first goal of the Finals. The Oilers then won game five by the score of 5–2 thanks to Gretzky's two first-period goals, and two Duane Sutter penalties. They became the first former WHA team, and the first team from Edmonton, to win the Stanley Cup. Mark Messier was awarded with the Conn Smythe Trophy as playoff MVP.

Broadcasting
The series aired on CBC in Canada and on the USA Network in the United States. USA's national coverage was blacked out in the New York area due to the local rights to Islanders games in that TV market, with SportsChannel New York airing games one and two, and WOR televising the other three games.

Team rosters

Edmonton Oilers

|}

New York Islanders

 

|}

Stanley Cup engraving
The 1984 Stanley Cup was presented to Oilers captain Wayne Gretzky by NHL President John Ziegler following the Oilers 5–2 win over the Islanders in game five.

The following Oilers players and staff had their names engraved on the Stanley Cup:

1983–84 Edmonton Oilers

See also
 List of Stanley Cup champions
 1983–84 NHL season

References

Inline citations

Bibliography

 Podnieks, Andrew; Hockey Hall of Fame (2004). Lord Stanley's Cup. Bolton, Ont.: Fenn Pub. pp 12, 50. 

 
Stanley
Stanley Cup Finals
Edmonton Oilers games
New York Islanders games
May 1984 sports events in North America
Ice hockey competitions in Edmonton
1980s in Edmonton
Sports competitions in New York (state)
1984 in sports in New York (state)
1984 in Alberta
1984 in Canadian sports